Ximeng Va Autonomous County (Va:  or ) is an autonomous county under the jurisdiction of Pu'er City, in the southwest of Yunnan Province, China, bordering Myanmar's Shan State to the west. Wa/Va people, who speak the Wa language, are the main inhabitants in Ximeng County.

Administrative divisions
In the present, Ximeng Va Autonomous County has 5 towns 1 township and 1 ethnic township.
5 towns

1 township
 Yuesong

1 ethnic township
 Lahu Lisuo

Climate

References

External links
Ximeng County Official Site

County-level divisions of Pu'er City
Wa autonomous counties